The following is a list of indoor arenas in France with a capacity of at least 2,500 spectators, most of the arenas in this list are for multi use proposes and are used for popular sports such as individual sports like karate, judo, boxing as well as team sports like handball, basketball, volleyball. The arenas also serves as a venue for cultural and political events.

Currently in use

See also 
List of football stadiums in France
List of indoor arenas by capacity

References 

 
France
Indoor arenas